Mohd Khuzzan bin Abu Bakar is a Malaysian politician who served as Member of the Johor State Executive Council (EXCO) in the Pakatan Harapan (PH) state administration under former Menteris Besar Osman Sapian and Sahruddin Jamal from May 2018 to the collapse of the PH state administration in February 2020 and Member of the Johor State Legislative Assembly (MLA) for Semerah from May 2018 to March 2022. He is a member of the People's Justice Party (PKR), a component party of the PH opposition coalition.

Election results

References 

Living people
People from Johor
Malaysian people of Malay descent
People's Justice Party (Malaysia) politicians
21st-century Malaysian politicians
Year of birth missing (living people)
Members of the Johor State Legislative Assembly
Johor state executive councillors